Mercedes Soler (born Mercedes Díaz Pavia; 19 November 1914 – 16 February 1971) was a Mexican American film actress of the Golden Age of Mexican cinema. She appeared in over 20 films in her career.

Early life
Mercedes Soler was born in the United States as Mercedes Díaz Pavía on 19 November 1914 to Domingo Díaz García and Irene Pavía Soler, but was raised and lived in Mexico. She was the younger sister of Fernando Soler, Andrés Soler, Domingo Soler, and Julián Soler, a family known as the Soler Dynasty.

Personal life
Mercedes Soler was married to Alejandro Ciangherotti until she died on 16 February 1971. They had two sons, Alejandro Ciangherotti II and Fernando Luján, and one daughter, Mercedes Ciangherotti de Gomar.

Filmography

References

External links

1914 births
1971 deaths
Mexican film actresses
20th-century Mexican actresses
American emigrants to Mexico